The general officers of the Confederate States Army (CSA) were the senior military leaders of the Confederate States of America during the American Civil War of 1861–1865. They were often former officers from the United States Army (the regular army) before the Civil War, while others were given the rank based on merit or when necessity demanded. Most Confederate generals needed confirmation from the Confederate States Congress, much like prospective generals in the modern U.S. armed forces.

Like all of the Confederacy's military forces, these generals answered to their civilian leadership, in particular Jefferson Davis, the [[President of the Confederate States of America] and therefore commander-in-chief of the Military forces of the Confederate States.

History

Much of the design of the Confederate States Army was based on the structure and customs of the United States Army when the Confederate States Congress established the Confederate States War Department on February 21, 1861. The Confederate States Army was composed of three parts; the Army of the Confederate States of America (ACSA, intended to be the permanent, regular army), the Provisional Army of the Confederate States (PACS, or "volunteer" Army, to be disbanded after hostilities), and the various Confederate States State militias.

Graduates from United States Military Academy and Mexican–American War veterans were highly sought after by Jefferson Davis for military service, especially as general officers. Like their U.S. Army counterparts, the Confederate Army had both professional and political generals within it. Ranks throughout the CSA were roughly based on the U.S. Army in design and seniority. On February 27, 1861, a general staff for the army was authorized, consisting of four positions: an adjutant general, a quartermaster general, a commissary general, and a surgeon general. Initially, the last of these was to be a staff officer only. The post of adjutant general was filled by Samuel Cooper (the position he had held as a colonel in the U.S. Army from 1852 until resigning) and he held it throughout the Civil War, as well as the army's inspector general.

Initially, the Confederate States Army commissioned only brigadier generals in both the volunteer and regular services; however, the Congress quickly passed legislation allowing for the appointment of major generals as well as generals, thus providing clear and distinct seniority over the existing major generals in the various state militias. On May 16, 1861, when there were only five officers at the grade of brigadier general, this legislation was passed, which stated in part:

As of September 18, 1862, when lieutenant generals were authorized, the Confederate States Army had four grades of general officers; they were (in order of increasing rank) brigadier general, major general, lieutenant general, and general. As officers were appointed to the various grades of general by Jefferson Davis (and were confirmed), he would create the promotion lists himself. The dates of rank, as well as seniority of officers appointed to the same grade on the same day, were determined by Davis, "usually following the guidelines established for the prewar U.S. Army."

Brigadier general
These generals were most often infantry or cavalry brigade commanders, aides to other higher-ranking generals, and War Department staff officers. By the war's end, the Confederacy had at least 383 different men who held this rank in the PACS and three in the ACSA: Samuel Cooper, Robert E. Lee, and Joseph E. Johnston. The Confederate States Congress authorized the organization of regiments into brigades on March 6, 1861. Brigadier generals commanded them, and these generals were nominated by Davis and confirmed by the Confederate Senate.

Though close to the U.S. Army in assignments, Confederate brigadiers mainly commanded brigades, while U.S. brigadiers sometimes led divisions and brigades, particularly in the first years of the war. These generals also often led sub-districts within military departments, with command over soldiers in their sub-district. These generals outranked Confederate States Army colonels, who commonly led infantry regiments.

This rank was equivalent to brigadier general in the modern U.S. Army.

Major general

These generals were most commonly infantry division commanders, aides to other higher-ranking generals, and War Department staff officers. They also led the districts that made up military departments and had command over the troops in their districts. Some Major generals also led smaller military departments. By the end of the war, the Confederacy had at least 88 men who had held this rank, all in the PACS.

The Confederate States Congress authorized divisions on March 6, 1861, and major generals would command them. These generals were to be nominated by Davis and confirmed by the Confederate Senate. Major generals outranked brigadiers and all other lesser officers.

This rank was not synonymous with use in the U.S. Army, where major generals led divisions, corps, and entire armies. This rank was equivalent in most respects to a major general in the modern U.S. Army.

Major generals by seniority
Not further promoted
 

Evander Mclver Law was promoted to the rank of Major General on March 20, 1865, on the recommendation of Generals Johnston and Hampton just before the surrender. The promotion was too late to be confirmed by the Confederate Congress however.

Lieutenant general

There were 18 lieutenant generals in the Confederate States Army, and these general officers were often corps commanders within armies or military department heads in charge of geographic sections and all soldiers in those boundaries. All of the Confederate lieutenant generals were in the PACS. The Confederate Congress legalized the creation of army corps on September 18, 1862, and directed that lieutenant generals lead them. These generals were to be nominated by President Davis and confirmed by the C.S. Senate. Lieutenant generals outranked major generals and all other lesser officers.

This rank was not synonymous with the U.S. Army's use of it; Ulysses S. Grant (1822–1885) was one of only two U.S. lieutenant generals during the war, the other being Winfield Scott (1786–1866), General-in-Chief of the United States Army 1841–1861, at the beginning of the American Civil War who also served in the War of 1812 (1812–1815), and led an army in the field during the Mexican–American War (1846–1849), received a promotion to brevet lieutenant general by a special Act of Congress in 1855. Gen. Grant was the only U.S. Army lieutenant general in active service at the time of his promotion on March 9, 1864. Grant became General-in-Chief, commander of the United States Army ("Union Army"), answering directly to President Abraham Lincoln and charged with the task of leading the U.S. Army to victory over the Confederate States Army. The CSA lieutenant general rank is also roughly equivalent to lieutenant general in the modern U.S. Army.

The Confederate Congress passed legislation in May 1864 to allow for "temporary" general officers in the PACS, to be appointed by President Jefferson Davis and confirmed by the Confederate Senate and given a non-permanent command by Davis. Under this law, Davis appointed several officers to fill open positions. Richard H. Anderson was appointed a "temporary" lieutenant general on May 31, 1864, and given command of the First Corps in the Army of Northern Virginia commanded by Gen. Lee (following the wounding of Lee's second-in-command, Lt. Gen. James Longstreet on May 6 in the Battle of the Wilderness.) With Longstreet's return that October, Anderson reverted to a major general. Jubal Early was appointed a "temporary" lieutenant general on May 31, 1864, and given command of the Second Corps (following the reassignment of Lt. Gen. Richard S. Ewell to other duties) and led the Corps as an army into the third Confederate attack on the United States in July 1864 during the Battle of Monocacy near Frederick, Maryland and the Battle of Fort Stevens outside the U.S. capital city, Washington, D.C., until December 1864, when he too reverted to a major general. Likewise, both Stephen D. Lee and Alexander P. Stewart were appointed to fill vacancies in the Western Theater as "temporary" lieutenant generals and also reverted to their prior grades as major generals as those assignments ended. However, Lee was nominated a second time for lieutenant general on March 11, 1865.

Lieutenant generals by seniority

General

Originally five officers in the Confederate States Army were appointed to the rank of general, and only two more would follow. These generals occupied the senior posts in the Confederate Army, mostly entire army or military department commanders and advisers to Jefferson Davis. This rank was equivalent to the general in the modern U.S. Army. The grade is often referred to in modern writings as "full general" to help differentiate it from the generic term "general", meaning simply "general officer".

All Confederate generals were enrolled in the ACSA to ensure that they outranked all militia officers, except for Edmund Kirby Smith, who was appointed general late in the war and into the PACS. Pierre G.T. Beauregard, had also initially been appointed a PACS general, was elevated to ACSA two months later with the same date of rank. These generals outranked all other grades of generals and lesser officers in the Confederate States Army.

The first group of officers appointed to general was Samuel Cooper, Albert Sidney Johnston, Robert E. Lee, Joseph E. Johnston, and Pierre G.T. Beauregard, with their seniority in that order. This ordering caused Cooper, a staff officer who would not see combat, to be the senior general officer in the CSA. That seniority strained the relationship between Joseph E. Johnston and Jefferson Davis. Johnston considered himself the senior officer in the Confederate States Army and resented the ranks that President Davis had authorized. However, his previous position in the U.S. Army was staff, not line, which was a criterion for Davis regarding establishing seniority and rank in the subsequent Confederate States Army.

On February 17, 1864, Congress passed legislation to allow President Davis to appoint an officer to command the Trans-Mississippi Department in the Far West, with the rank of general in the PACS. Edmund Kirby Smith was the only officer appointed to this position. Braxton Bragg was appointed a general in the ACSA with a date of rank of April 6, 1862, the day his commanding officer Gen. Albert Sidney Johnston died in combat at Shiloh/Pittsburg Landing.

The Confederate Congress passed legislation in May 1864 to allow for "temporary" general officers in the PACS, to be appointed by Davis and confirmed by the C.S. Senate and given a non-permanent command by Davis.
John Bell Hood was appointed a "temporary" general on July 18, 1864, the date he took command of the Army of Tennessee in the Atlanta Campaign, but the Congress did not later confirm this appointment, and he reverted to his rank of lieutenant general in January 1865. Later in March 1865, shortly before the end of the war, Hood's status was spelled out by the Confederate States Senate, which stated:

Generals by seniority
 

Note that during 1863, Beauregard, Cooper, J. Johnston, and Lee all had their ranks re-nominated on February 20 and then re-confirmed on April 23 by the Confederate Congress. This was in response to debates on February 17 about whether confirmations made by the provisional legislature needed re-confirmation by the permanent legislature, which was done by an Act of Congress issued two days later.

General in Chief
The position of General in Chief of the Armies of the Confederate States was created on January 23, 1865. Gen. Robert E. Lee, the only officer appointed to it, served from February 6 until April 12.

Militia generals

The Confederate states had maintained militias since the American Revolutionary War, consistent with the U.S. Militia Act of 1792. They went by various names such as State "Militia", "Armies", or "Guard" and were activated and expanded when the Civil War began. These units were commanded by "Militia Generals" to defend their particular state and sometimes did not leave the state to fight for the Confederate Army. The Confederate militias used the brigadier and major general officer ranks.

The regulations in the Act of 1792 provided for two classes of militia, divided by age. Class one included men from 22 to 30 years old, and class two consisted of men from 18 to 20 years and from 31 to 45 years old. The various Confederate states used this system during the war.

Uniform insignia

All Confederate generals wore the same uniform insignia regardless of their general rank, except for Robert E. Lee, who wore the uniform of a Confederate colonel. The only visible difference was the button groupings on their uniforms; groups of three buttons for lieutenant and major generals and two for brigadier generals. In either case, a general's buttons were also distinguished from other ranks by their eagle insignia.

To the right is a picture of the CSA general's full uniform, in this case, of Brig. Gen. Joseph R. Anderson of the Confederate Bureau of Ordnance. All of the Confederate generals wore uniforms like this regardless of their general grade, and all with gold-colored embroidering.

Pay
The general officers of the Confederate States Army were paid for their services, and exactly how much (in Confederate dollars (CSD)) depended on their rank and whether they held a field command or not. On March 6, 1861, when the army only contained brigadier generals, their pay was $301 CSD monthly, and their aide-de-camp lieutenants would receive an additional $35 CSD per month beyond regular pay. As more grades of the general officer were added, the pay scale was adjusted. By June 10, 1864, a general received $500 CSD monthly, plus another $500 CSD if they led an army in the field. Also, by that date, lieutenant generals got $450 CSD and major generals $350 CSD, and brigadiers would receive $50 CSD in addition to regular pay if they served in combat.

Legacy
The Confederate States Army lost more general officers killed in combat than the United States Army throughout the war, in the ratio of about 5-to-1 for the Confederacy compared to roughly 12-to-1 for the United States. The most famous of them is General Thomas "Stonewall" Jackson, among the best-known Confederate commanders, after General Robert E. Lee. Jackson's death was the result of pneumonia which emerged subsequently after a friendly fire incident had occurred at the Battle of Chancellorsville on the night of May 2, 1863. Replacing these fallen generals was an ongoing problem during the war, often having men promoted beyond their abilities (a common criticism of officers such as John Bell Hood and George Pickett, but an issue for both armies), or gravely wounded in combat but needed, such as Richard S. Ewell. The problem was made more difficult by the Confederacy's depleting workforce, especially near the war's end.

The last Confederate general in the field, Stand Watie, surrendered on June 23, 1865, and the war's last surviving Confederate full general, Edmund Kirby Smith, died on March 28, 1893. James Longstreet died on January 2, 1904, and was considered "the last of the high command of the Confederacy".

The Confederate States Army's system of using four grades of general officers is currently the same rank structure used by the U.S. Army (in use since shortly after the Civil War) and is also the system used by the U.S. Marine Corps (in use since World War II).

See also

 List of American Civil War generals (Union)
 List of American Civil War brevet generals (Union)
 List of American Civil War generals (Confederate)
 List of American Civil War generals (Acting Confederate)
 General officers in the United States

Notes

References
 Dupuy, Trevor N., Johnson, Curt, and Bongard, David L., Harper Encyclopedia of Military Biography, Castle Books, 1992, 1st Ed., .
 Eicher, John H., and Eicher, David J., Civil War High Commands, Stanford University Press, 2001, .
 Foote, Shelby, The Civil War: A Narrative: Vol. III Red River to Appomattox, Vintage Books, 1986, .
 Katcher, Philip, The Army of Robert E. Lee, Sterling Publishing Co., 1994, .
 Warner, Ezra J., Generals in Gray: The Lives of the Confederate Commanders, Louisiana State University Press, 1959, .
 Wright, Marcus J., General Officers of the Confederate Army, J. M. Carroll & Co., 1983, .

Further reading
 Evans, Clement A., Confederate Military History — Volume I, Confederate Publishing Company, 1899, Atlanta, Ga., facsimile reprint by The National Historical Society, 2008.

 Z
+